Stone Blues is an album by American saxophonist Ken McIntyre. It was the first record that McIntyre recorded, done in 1960 for the New Jazz label, although it was released in 1962, subsequent to the release of Looking Ahead.

Reception

Allmusic awarded the album 4½ stars stating "This early effort by Ken McIntyre (who doubles here on alto and flute) grows in interest with each listen... essentially advanced bop slightly influenced by the "new thing" music of Ornette Coleman".

Track listing
All compositions by Ken McIntyre except as indicated
 "Stone Blues" - 11:44
 "Cornballs" - 4:21
 "Blanche" - 6:00
 "Mellifluous" - 7:14
 "Smax" - 5:07
 "Charshee" - 4:39
 "I'll Close My Eyes" (Buddy Kaye, Billy Reid) - 5:22

Personnel 
 Ken McIntyre - alto saxophone, flute
 John Mancebo Lewis - trombone 
 Dizzy Sal - piano
 Paul Morrison - bass
 Bobby Ward - drums

References 

1960 albums
Makanda Ken McIntyre albums
New Jazz Records albums
Albums produced by Esmond Edwards
Albums recorded at Van Gelder Studio